École des Ponts Business School is the business school of École des Ponts ParisTech, which is one of the oldest and most prestigious French Grandes Écoles, founded by royal decree of King Louis XV in 1747 and formerly known as École Nationale des Ponts et Chaussées.

École des Ponts Business School is an international business school and research institution based in Paris, France that offers a Global Executive MBA (EMBA), a Full-Time Masters in Business Administration (MBA), an Executive Doctorate in Business Administration and many specialized certificates and programs in Europe (Paris), Africa (Morocco) and Asia (China).  École des Ponts Business School is also a leader in research and has centers such as the Circular Economy Research Center (CERC), CPC-Paris (Center for Policy and Competitiveness) and CASE:Africa (Center for Advanced Studies and Expertise). The research themes include: Circular Economy, Innovation & Entrepreneurship, Leadership and Talent Management and Digital Transformation & Change Management.

History 
Established as ENPC School of International Management in 1987 by Celia Russo in 1987 to promote the study of international business and value-based global leadership. It later changed its name to École des Ponts Business School.

Celia Russo, was selected in 1980 by Jacques Tanzi – the then recently appointed Director of Ecole nationale des ponts et chaussées – to set up the Department of Languages and International Culture. Her appointment as a foreigner and as a woman, who was not an engineer, in a wholly French, male-dominated establishment caused an uproar among the school's Board of Governors.  Seven years later, the Board ultimately decided unanimously to implement the business school Celia Russo designed and to support the degree that went with it and to appoint Celia to run it as the Dean. Celia Russo became the first Dean of École des Ponts Business School from 1987 until her death in 1999. She was also a recipient of the Vermeil Medal Society Encouragement au Progres in 1990, and was awarded the Chevalier de l'Ordre du Mérite from the President of France in 1997 - this award is the second highest given by the French Republic to honor people of distinguished merit.

Michel Fender, a Professor of Logistics and Supply Chain Management, succeeded Russo as Dean and worked in that position until 2001. Michel Fender and Tawfik Jelassi were assigned as co-Deans in 2001 until 2004  and in 2004, Tawfik Jelassi was named Dean. In 2014, Professor Alon Rozen was named Dean and is the current Dean and Professor of Innovation Management.

Grande École System 

École des Ponts is a Grande école, a French institution of higher education that is separate from, but parallel and connected to the main framework of the French public university system. Similar to the Ivy League in the United States, Oxbridge in the UK, and C9 League in China, Grandes Écoles are elite academic institutions that admit students through an extremely competitive process. Alums go on to occupy elite positions within government, administration, and corporate firms in France.

Although they are more expensive than public universities in France, Grandes Écoles typically have much smaller class sizes and student bodies, and many of their programs are taught in English. International internships, study abroad opportunities, and close ties with government and the corporate world are a hallmark of the Grandes Écoles. Many of the top ranked business schools in Europe are members of the Conférence des Grandes Écoles (CGE), as is École des Ponts Business School, and out of the 250 business schools in France, only 39 are CGE members.

Degrees from École des Ponts are accredited by the Conférence des Grandes Écoles and awarded by the Ministry of National Education (France). École des Ponts is further accredited by the elite international business school accrediting organizations and it holds double accreditation: The Association to Advance Collegiate Schools of Business (AACSB), and Association of MBAs (AMBA)

Rankings 

École des Ponts Business School was ranked 30th of European Business schools in 2004 by the Financial TimesThe Financial Times. In 2005, due to changes in the Financial Times ranking criteria the school's "Visiting Faculty Model" that is a defining featured of École des Ponts Business School's teaching model, excluded it from the ranking.

In 2010, École des Ponts Business School's joint degree with SIMBA was ranked 39 th in The Financial Times' Top 100 EMBA Rankings.

In the 2010 Full-Time MBA Ranking published by The Economist, the school's program was ranked 20th among Continental European MBAs and was the only Paris-based MBA listed in the ranking.

In 2011, the SMBG Eduniversal ranking listed École des Ponts Business School as an Excellent Business School

Since 2015, CEO Magazine has ranked École des Ponts Business School's Full-Time MBA program as #1 in the world and in the 1st Tier of schools internationally.

In 2017, École des Ponts Business School's Global Executive MBA program was ranked #2 worldwide and ranked #20 by QS.

Programs

MBA full-time programs 

École des Ponts Business School offers an internationally accredited MBA Full-Time program in Innovation Management based on a project-based curriculum and a visiting faculty model that brings global experts to teach from around the world. Participants acquire a 'learn-apply-test-iterate' approach to business and leadership. The academic schedule is divided into three terms: First Term -Leading & Managing, Second Term - Business Performance, Third term - Innovative & Agile Mindset.

Global Executive MBA 
Based on three executive projects, the program consists of 17 classes and 3 international study trips. Taught in English with a modular format on weekends, the program is offered in central Paris and in Casablanca.

LEADTech Global Executive MBA 
LeadTech Global Executive MBA Program is an entrepreneurship and technology-focused GEMBA program offered jointly by École des Ponts and EADA Business School in Barcelona that results in dual MBA degrees conferred by each institution.  It extends the standard business curriculum with a set of courses focused on global innovation, leadership, and technology.  The program features a blended delivery model with a mix of courses delivered online and those delivered during 8 week-long residencies, 3 each in Paris and Barcelona and one each in Silicon Valley and Singapore.  Participants also participate in workshops at the Mobile World Congress and international study trips.

Doctoral programs 
École des Ponts Business School's Executive DBA program is a 3-to-5-year program with four residential sessions and integrates three unique elements: a learning lab experience, highly structured research methods courses and an innovative 3-part doctoral project.

Undergraduates programs 
École des Ponts Business School runs programs aimed at introducing undergrads in France and especially the ParisTech engineering students, to the fundamentals of business and management. These programs were designed to complement the French engineering curricula and better prepare students for a potentially multi-faceted career in their futures. These certificate programs have been running since 2000 and offer two specializations:
 a Certificate in International Management (cIM)
 a Certificate in Technology & Entrepreneurship (CTE)

Deans 

 Celia Russo (1987–1999)
 Michel Fender (1999–2004)
 Tawfik Jelassi (2004–2013)
 Alon Rozen (2014–present)

Affiliated alumni associations 
 PONTS Alliance
 Alumni Association of École des Ponts Business School

See also 
 École nationale des ponts et chaussées
 Paris Institute of Technology
 AMBA

References

External links 
 
 
 ParisTech
 ENPC École Nationale des Ponts et Chaussées (Ecole des Ponts ParisTech) 

Engineering universities and colleges in France
Business schools in France
1987 establishments in France
ParisTech